Lesley-Ann Skeete (born 20 February 1967) is a female English former track and field athlete who competed in the 100 metres hurdles. She represented Great Britain at the 1988 Olympic Games in Seoul and the 1992 Olympic Games in Barcelona. She also won a bronze medal at the 1990 Commonwealth Games in Auckland.

Career
Skeete was born in Sydenham, England and was raised in Swindon. She first came to prominence in 1985 as a teenager, winning the first of two English Schools 100 metres hurdles titles and placing third at the UK Championships behind Judy Simpson and Judith Rodgers in 13.76 seconds. She began 1986 by claiming her first senior national title at the AAAs indoor championships, winning the 60 m hurdles in 8.22 secs. In the summer of 1986, Skeete placed second in the 100 m hurdles at both the UK Championships and the AAA Championships behind Sally Gunnell and ahead of both Wendy Jeal and Olympic silver medalist Shirley Strong. At the Commonwealth Games in Edinburgh, she finished fifth for England in the final in a time of 13.66.

In the 1987 indoor season, after retaining her AAAs title, Skeete reached the 60 m hurdles final at both the European Indoor Championships and the World Indoor Championships. At the Europeans in Lievin, she was fifth in 8.07, having run a UK record of 8.06 in both the heats and semis. At the World Indoors in Indianapolis, she was sixth in 8.18 secs. Outdoors, she won the UK title in 13.29, ahead of Kim Hagger and Wendy Jeal before again finishing second to Sally Gunnell at the AAAs Championships. At the World Championships in Rome, she was eliminated in the heats in 13.40.

In 1988, Skeete finished second to Gunnell at the AAAs Championships, earning selection for the 1988 Olympic Games in Seoul, South Korea. In Seoul, she reached the semi-finals, running 13.23. In 1989, Skeete won her third AAAs 60 m hurdles title indoors, while outdoors, she finished second at the UK Championships and third at the AAAs Championships. In January 1990 at the Commonwealth Games in Auckland, she won the bronze medal for England in time of 13.31, behind Kay Morley and Sally Gunnell. Later that year, she ran her lifetime best in the 100 m hurdles to win the AAAs title, edging out Kay Morley 13.03 to 13.05. At the 1990 European Championships in Split, she reached the semi-finals, where she ran 13.37.

In 1991, Skeete won her fourth AAAs indoor 60 m hurdles title and reached the semi-finals at the World Indoor Championships in Seville, running 8.15. In the summer, she won her second UK title, before finishing second to Sally Gunnell (for the fourth time) at the AAAs Championships, Gunnell narrowly winning, 13.02 to 13.05. At the World Championships in Tokyo, she was eliminated in the heats in 13.33.

Skeekte began the 1992 summer season by finishing second at the UK Championships in June. Running into a strong headwind, she narrowly lost to Kay Morley-Brown, 13.59 to 13.67. In July at the AAAs Championships, incorporating the Olympic trials, she finished third behind Gunnell and Morley-Brown in a season's best of 13.38, earning selection for the Olympic Games in Barcelona, Spain. In Barcelona, she was eliminated in the heats in 13.42. The 1992 Olympics would prove to be Skeete's final appearance at a major Championships.

Skeete has a total of 14 top three placements in the 100m hurdles at the AAA and UK Championships (three wins). Her final top three finish came in 1994, when she finished third behind Clova Court and Sally Gunnell at the AAA Championships. As of 2018, her lifetime best of 8.06 in the 60 m hurdles, ranks her 10th on the UK all-time list. In the 100 m hurdles, her best of 13.03, ranks her 16th on the UK all-time list.

Competition record

Four AAA Indoor Championships 60 metres hurdles titles (1986, 1987, 1989, 1991)

References

External links

1967 births
Living people
People from Sydenham, London
English female hurdlers
British female hurdlers
Olympic athletes of Great Britain
Athletes (track and field) at the 1988 Summer Olympics
Athletes (track and field) at the 1992 Summer Olympics
Commonwealth Games medallists in athletics
Commonwealth Games bronze medallists for England
Athletes (track and field) at the 1990 Commonwealth Games
World Athletics Championships athletes for Great Britain
Black British sportswomen
Medallists at the 1990 Commonwealth Games